Ricardo S. Senn (3 April 1931 – 26 July 2012) was a track and road bicycle racer from Argentina, who won the men's individual road race at the 1959 Pan American Games. He represented his native country at the 1960 Summer Olympics, finishing in 44th place in the men's road race.

References

1931 births
2012 deaths
Argentine male cyclists
Cyclists at the 1960 Summer Olympics
Olympic cyclists of Argentina
Argentine people of German descent
Sportspeople from Córdoba, Argentina
Pan American Games gold medalists for Argentina
Pan American Games bronze medalists for Argentina
Pan American Games medalists in cycling
Competitors at the 1959 Pan American Games
Medalists at the 1959 Pan American Games